Ischnocolus jickelii is a small, old-world tarantula. It is found in Aden, Djibouti, Ethiopia, the United Arab Emirates and Somalia. It was first described by Ludwig Koch in 1875. In 1890, French arachnologist Eugène Simon described Chaetopelma adenense. In 2008, José Guadanucci and Richard C. Gallon decided that these were the same species, making Simon's Chaetopelma adenense a synonym.

References

Theraphosidae
Spiders of Africa
Spiders described in 1875